Surfaces may refer to several publications
Surfaces (Université de Montréal journal), published from 1991 to 1999
Surfaces (MDPI journal), published from 2018 onwards

See also
Surface Science (journal)
Surface (magazine)